The 1890 Lehigh football team was an American football team that represented Lehigh University in the 1890 college football season. The team compiled a 7–4 record and outscored opponents by a total of 282 to 125.

Schedule

References

Lehigh
Lehigh Mountain Hawks football seasons
Lehigh football